The National Shrine of Our Lady of Good Help, also dedicated as the Shrine of Our Lady of Good Help, is a Marian shrine, located within the Roman Catholic Diocese of Green Bay in the United States. The chapel is in the Champion section of Green Bay, about 16 miles (26 km) northeast of downtown Green Bay proper. It stands on the site of the reported Marian apparition to a Belgian-born woman, Adele Brise, in the year 1859.

The apparition was formally approved on December 8, 2010, by Bishop David L. Ricken, becoming the first Marian apparition approved by the Catholic Church in the United States. Bishop Ricken also approved the chapel as a diocesan shrine, recognizing its long history as a place of pilgrimage and prayer.

Apparitions of 1859

Adele Brise was born in Belgium in 1831. Together with her parents, she immigrated to Wisconsin in 1855. In early October 1859, Adele reported seeing a woman clothed in white and standing between two trees, a hemlock and a maple. Adele described the woman as surrounded by a bright light, clothed in dazzling white with a yellow sash around her waist and a crown of stars above her flowing blond locks. She was frightened by the vision and prayed until it disappeared. When she told her parents what she had seen, they suggested that a poor soul might be in need of prayers.

The following Sunday, which was October 8, 1859, she saw the apparition a second time while walking to Mass in the community of Bay Settlement. Her sister and another woman (Marie Therese Frisson, 1821–1898) were with her at the time but neither of them saw anything. She asked the parish priest for advice, and he told her that if she saw the apparition again, she should ask it, "In the Name of God, who are you and what do you wish of me?"

Returning from Mass that same day, she saw the apparition a third time, and this time asked the question she was given. The lady replied, "I am the Queen of Heaven, who prays for the conversion of sinners, and I wish you to do the same." Adele Brise was also given a mission to "gather the children in this wild country and teach them what they should know for salvation."

Brise, who was 28 years old at the time of the apparition, devoted the rest of her life to teaching children. She initially traveled on foot from house to house, but later opened a small school. Other women joined her in her work and they formed a community of sisters according to the rule of the Third Order Franciscans, although Brise never took public vows as a nun. She died on July 5, 1896.

Chapel

Early history

The original chapel was a 10 foot by 12 foot wooden structure built by Lambert Brise, the father of Adele Brice, at the site of the Marian apparition. Mrs. Isabella Doyen donated the  surrounding the spot, and a larger (24 foot by 40 foot) wooden church was built in 1861. This chapel bore the inscription "Notre Dame de bon Secours, priez pour nous", giving the shrine its present name. The site became a popular place of pilgrimage and the chapel was soon too small to accommodate the pilgrims who were coming. A larger brick chapel was built in 1880 and dedicated by Bishop Francis Xavier Krautbauer, the second bishop of the Roman Catholic Diocese of Green Bay. A school and a convent were also built on the site in the 1880s.

Peshtigo Fire

Lumber companies and sawmills had been harvesting the woods of Wisconsin, leaving piles of sawdust and branches as they produced lumber and wood products. The night of October 8, 1871, a firestorm began near Peshtigo, Wisconsin, that spread through the woods and towns, consuming everything in its path. Unable to outrun the flames, nearly 2,000 people died in the inferno. Some people assume that, driven by strong winds, the conflagration leaped across Green Bay of Lake Michigan and began burning huge sections of the Door Peninsula. When the firestorm – of whatever origin – threatened the chapel, Adele Brise refused to leave and instead organized a procession to beg the Virgin Mary for her protection. The surrounding land was destroyed by the fire but the chapel and its grounds, together with all the people who had taken refuge there, survived the fire unharmed.

Present day
The current building at the shrine was built in 1942, with support from Bishop Paul Peter Rhode, who dedicated the new building in July 1942. It is a Tudor Gothic style building which accommodates approximately 300 people in an upper Apparition Chapel with a small Apparition Oratory for prayer on the lower level. The Apparition Oratory also contains a collection of crutches left behind in thanksgiving by people who came to pray at the shrine. The grounds of the shrine have an outdoor area for a Rosary walk and Stations of the Cross.

The largest annual gathering at the chapel happens on the feast of the Assumption of the Blessed Virgin Mary, on August 15, celebrated with an outdoor Mass and a procession around the grounds of the shrine.

The Shrine of Our Lady of Good Help gained national recognition when the apparitions were approved, after a two-year investigation, by Bishop David Ricken on December 8, 2010, making it the first and only apparition approved by the Catholic Church in the United States. Bishop Ricken noted that his predecessors had implicitly endorsed the shrine by holding services there over the years.

On August 15, 2016, the U.S. Conference of Catholic Bishops designated the shrine as a National Shrine. In recognition of this, the shrine's name was changed to The National Shrine of Our Lady of Good Help.

Images

References

External links

Our Lady of Good Help
Catholic Diocese of Green Bay
Adele Brise-Wisconsin Historical Society

Churches in the Roman Catholic Diocese of Green Bay
Belgian-American culture in Wisconsin
Churches in Brown County, Wisconsin
Good Help
Good Help
Tourist attractions in Brown County, Wisconsin
Roman Catholic churches completed in 1942
1861 establishments in Wisconsin
20th-century Roman Catholic church buildings in the United States